Peter Loli (born 2 February 1980) is an Australian rugby union player who played as an outside back for the Queensland Reds as well as for Queensland Reds B (also known as the Queensland Red Heelers).

Career

Born in Auckland, New Zealand, Loli began playing his junior rugby for Otahuhu RFC before moving to Queensland at the age of 12. After arriving in Australia Loli played his junior rugby for North Brisbane Rugby Club.
While attending Marist College Ashgrove, Loli signed with the Queensland Reds. Loli became the second player ever to sign with the Queensland Reds while still at school, the first being Elton Flatley.

Loli also represented Australia in the World Rugby Sevens Series (formerly known as the IRB Sevens World Series) as well as being selected for the Australian Barbarians. 

Loli played premier grade for Brothers Old Boys, North Brisbane Rugby Club, and finally with GPS Rugby Club.

Personal life
Peter Loli is the son of Laufika Loli and Alosina To'omalatai, both of Samoan heritage. Loli's mother is the cousin of Samoan rugby international Stan To'omalatai.

References

1980 births
Rugby union players from Auckland
Australia international rugby sevens players
Queensland Reds players
Living people